Muhammad Aziz may be an alternative spelling of the names of the following persons:

 Mohamad Aziz (born 1940), Malaysian politician
 Mohammed Aziz (1954–2018), Indian playback singer

See also 
 Mohammad Azizi (born 1988), Iranian footballer
 Muhammad Aziz Khan (born 1947), Pakistani army officer